The Filmfare Best Dialogue Award is given by the Filmfare as part of its annual Filmfare Awards for Hindi films. Here is a list of the award winners since 1958 and the films for which they won.

Superlatives

Most Awards
Gulzar – 4
Rahi Masoom Raza – 3 
Aditya Chopra – 3
Rajkumar Hirani & Abhijat Joshi - 3 (won jointly for a film)
Kader Khan – 2
Rajinder Singh Bedi - 2
Wajahat Mirza - 2
Akhtar ul Iman - 2
Javed Akhtar - 2

Gulzar, with 4 wins, holds the record for most awards in this category, followed by Rahi Masoom Raza, Aditya Chopra and Rajkumar Hirani & Abhijat Joshi, who have won 3 awards each. Writers who have won the awards twice include Rajinder Singh Bedi, Wajahat Mirza, Kader Khan, Akhtar ul Iman and Javed Akhtar. Dr. Achla Nagar and Juhi Chaturvedi are the only women to have won the award for Best Dialogue, winning for Nikaah and Gulabo Sitabo, respectively.

List

See also
 Filmfare Award
 Bollywood
 Cinema of India

References

External links
Filmfare Awards Best Dialogue Action

Dialogue